

References 

Post-nominal letters
S
Post